Bolma minutiradiosa is a species of sea snail, a marine gastropod mollusk in the family Turbinidae, the turban snails.

Description
The size of the shell varies between 12 mm and 20 mm.

Distribution
This marine species occurs off the Philippines.

References

 Kosuge S., 1983. – Description of Two New Species of the Genus Bolma from Philippines with a List of Hitherto Known Species (Gastropoda Turbinacea). Bulletin of the Institute of Malacology of Tokyo 1(9): 129–132
 Alf A. & Kreipl K. (2011) The family Turbinidae. Subfamilies Turbininae Rafinesque, 1815 and Prisogasterinae Hickman & McLean, 1990. In: G.T. Poppe & K. Groh (eds), A Conchological Iconography. Hackenheim: Conchbooks. pp. 1–82, pls 104–245

External links
 

minutiradiosa
Gastropods described in 1983